Michelle Thomas (born 1971), is a female international athlete who competed for England.

Athletics career
She represented England and won a silver medal in the 4 x 400 metres relay event, at the 1998 Commonwealth Games in Kuala Lumpur, Malaysia. The other team members consisted of Donna Fraser, Michelle Pierre and Victoria Day.

References

1971 births
Living people
English female sprinters
Commonwealth Games medallists in athletics
Commonwealth Games silver medallists for England
Athletes (track and field) at the 1998 Commonwealth Games
Universiade medalists in athletics (track and field)
Universiade bronze medalists for Great Britain
Medallists at the 1998 Commonwealth Games